Allan Dempsie (born 5 November 1982) is a retired Scottish football player. He played most recently for Albion Rovers.

Career

Dempsie began his career at Hibernian, but made only five league appearances before being released in 2003. He moved down the divisions to sign for Elgin City, where he played for four seasons before joining Ayr United in 2008. Dempsie then returned to Elgin City for a second stint.

He moved to Albion Rovers in summer 2011, ahead of the 2011/12 season, but left Rovers after just three games.

Dempsie now works in banking, and also in sports consultancy where he uses the knowledge gained from 13 years of professional football.

Notes

External links
Irish Times profile

1982 births
Ayr United F.C. players
Elgin City F.C. players
Association football defenders
Hibernian F.C. players
Living people
Footballers from Bellshill
Scottish Football League players
Scottish footballers
Scottish Premier League players
Albion Rovers F.C. players